Mao Xinyu (born 17 January 1970) is a grandson of Mao Zedong and a major general in the People's Liberation Army of the People's Republic of China.

Early life and education
Born the son of Mao Anqing in 1970, he is one of Mao Zedong's twelve grandchildren. He spent the first 11 years of his life away from his parents, who were based in Russia. He graduated from the History Department of Renmin University of China in 1992. He works as a researcher at the People's Liberation Army Academy of Military Sciences, where he completed his doctorate.

Career
Mao has written several books, including Grandfather Mao Zedong (Yeye Mao Zedong), published by the National Defence University Press in October 2003.

In June 2009, Mao won promotion to the rank of major general in the People's Liberation Army in a controversial move. According to the Changjiang Daily, Mao is now the youngest general in the PLA. Some critics described his promotion as nepotism. "To have such an unqualified person become a general in China's military, it's an insult to the People's Liberation Army," said Pu Zhiqiang, a lawyer and human rights activist. By contrast, Bao Goujin, a spokesman for the Academy of Military Sciences, said "his is a natural elevation. Mao's many achievements earned him the right to be promoted." Mao's own view is that "family factors" contributed to his promotion.

Mao is also a member of the Chinese National Committee of the Chinese People's Political Consultative Conference, an advisory group to the central government.

In September 2011, Mao took up a teaching position at Guangzhou University, teaching Mao Zedong Thought at Songtian Professional College.

Family
Mao's father, Mao Anqing (1923–2007), was a child of Mao's marriage with Yang Kaihui. Anqing served as a Russian–Chinese interpreter for the Chinese Communist Party until he became disabled by a mental illness, possibly schizophrenia. His mother, Chairman Mao's daughter-in-law, was Shao Hua.

Mao's first wife was waitress Hao Mingli(郝明莉). The wedding ceremony was held on 7December 1997, but Hao died in 2003 at Qincheng Prison, an institution well known for its political prisoners, having been incarcerated there since 2002. Mao Xinyu remarried in 2003 to Liu Bin, who was from Zhenjiang, Jiangsu Province and whom he had met in 2000. Mao Xinyu and Liu Bin have one son, Mao Dongdong (毛东东, born 2003), as well as one daughter, Mao Tianyi (毛甜懿, born 2008).

In 2013, discussing his grandfather, he said that Mao Zedong had been "put on an altar" but "only by transforming them back into real people can they be understood and accepted by the public, who will then want to learn from them."

References

1970 births
Mao Zedong family
Living people
PLA Academy of Military Science alumni
Central Party School of the Chinese Communist Party alumni
Renmin University of China alumni
People's Liberation Army generals from Beijing
Members of the 11th Chinese People's Political Consultative Conference
Members of the 12th Chinese People's Political Consultative Conference
Academic staff of Guangzhou University
People's Republic of China historians
Poets from Beijing
Educators from Beijing
People's Republic of China calligraphers
Artists from Beijing
People's Republic of China poets
Historians from Beijing